The 2012–13 Louisiana–Lafayette Ragin' Cajuns women's basketball team represented the University of Louisiana at Lafayette during the 2012–13 NCAA Division I women's basketball season. The Ragin' Cajuns were led by first-year head coach Gary Broadhead; they played their double-header home games at the Cajundome with other games at the Earl K. Long Gymnasium, which is located on campus. They were members in the Sun Belt Conference. They finished the season 10–21, 3–17 in Sun Belt play to finish fifth place in the West Division. They were eliminated in the quarterfinals of the Sun Belt women's tournament.

Previous season 
The Ragin' Cajuns finished the 2011–12 season 7–23, 1–15 in Sun Belt play to finish sixth in the West Division. They made it to the 2012 Sun Belt Conference women's basketball tournament, losing in the first round game by a score of 53-71 to the Florida International Panthers. They were not invited to any other postseason tournament.

Roster

Schedule and results

|-
!colspan=9 style=| Exhibition

|-
!colspan=9 style=| Non-conference regular season

|-
!colspan=9 style=| Sun Belt regular season

|-
!colspan=9 style=| Non-conference regular season

|-
!colspan=9 style=| Sun Belt regular season

|-
!colspan=9 style=| Non-conference regular season

|-
!colspan=9 style=| Sun Belt regular season

|-
!colspan=9 style=| Sun Belt Women's Tournament (1-1)

See also
 2012–13 Louisiana–Lafayette Ragin' Cajuns men's basketball team

References

Louisiana Ragin' Cajuns women's basketball seasons
Louisiana-Lafayette
Louisiana
Louisiana